This article provides details of international football games played by the Singapore national football team from 2020 to present.

Results

2020 
No matches played due to the COVID-19 pandemic.

2021

2022

2023

References

External links 

 Football Association of Singapore

Football in Singapore
Results 2020
2020s in Singaporean sport